Samuel Medary (February 25, 1801 – November 7, 1864) was an American newspaper owner and politician.

Biography
Born and raised in Montgomery County, Pennsylvania, he settled in Bethel, Ohio, in 1825. After a term in the Ohio House of Representatives (1834) and the Ohio State Senate (1836–38) as a Jackson Democrat, he purchased a newspaper in Columbus that became the Ohio Statesman, which he edited until 1857. He was active at the National Democratic Conventions at Baltimore in 1844, where he was instrumental in the nomination of James K. Polk; and at Cincinnati in 1856, where he was the President pro tem.  President James Buchanan appointed him as the third Territorial Governor of Minnesota from April 23, 1857, to May 24, 1858. Minnesota became a state on May 11, 1858, and elected Henry Hastings Sibley as the state's first governor.

Samuel Medary was also Governor of Kansas Territory from December 1858 to December 1860. William F. Wheeler was territory Librarian and the Governor's Secretary while in office.

Returning to Columbus, Ohio, he established a newspaper he named The Crisis. While living in Columbus, Medary resided at his estate, Northwood Place, located along the Worthington Pike, now North High Street, near Northwood Avenue.  Medary was indicted by a federal grand jury in 1864 for conspiracy against the government and was arrested. He was released on bond, but died in Columbus, Ohio before he could be tried.

Legacy
One of the first townsites in Dakota Territory is named after Medary.  The town of Medaryville, Indiana was also named after him. In North Columbus, Ohio (annexed to the city of Columbus in the late 1800s) a street dating back to the early 1900s Medary Avenue was named for him. Because Columbus Public Schools names its schools for the street on which they are located, Medary Elementary School also carried his surname.

Medary was buried at Green Lawn Cemetery, Columbus, Ohio.

Notes

 

1801 births
1864 deaths
19th-century American newspaper editors
Burials at Green Lawn Cemetery (Columbus, Ohio)
Governors of Kansas Territory
Governors of Minnesota Territory
Minnesota Democrats
Members of the Ohio House of Representatives
Ohio state senators
Politicians from Columbus, Ohio
Kansas Democrats
American male journalists
19th-century American male writers
19th-century American politicians
Journalists from Ohio
People from Montgomery County, Pennsylvania
People from Bethel, Ohio